The Hulk is a fictional superhero in the Marvel Comics universe who first appeared in the comic book series The Incredible Hulk in 1962. The Hulk's first appearance in a video game was the 1984 graphic adventure computer game Questprobe featuring The Hulk, and the character began making appearances on home and handheld consoles a decade later. An earlier game was originally planned by Parker Brothers for the Atari 2600 in 1983, but was canceled in the midst of the video game crash. Several companies have developed games based on the Hulk, including Adventure International, Probe Entertainment, Attention to Detail, Radical Entertainment, Edge of Reality, and Amaze Entertainment. The Hulk's standalone titles are often action games that pit the Hulk against supervillains in a beat 'em up format, with his human alter ego Bruce Banner occasionally appearing for stealth or puzzle elements. Apart from his standalone titles, the Hulk also appears in several other Marvel titles within an ensemble cast; in these appearances, he is occasionally accompanied by members of his own supporting cast, such as his archnemesis Abomination and his cousin She-Hulk.

Standalone games

Related games

Canceled games

References

External links 
 

Hulk